In probability theory, the arcsine distribution is the probability distribution whose cumulative distribution function involves the arcsine and the square root:

for 0 ≤ x ≤ 1, and whose probability density function is

on (0, 1). The standard arcsine distribution is a special case of the beta distribution with α = β = 1/2. That is, if  is an arcsine-distributed random variable, then . By extension, the arcsine distribution is a special case of the Pearson type I distribution.

The arcsine distribution appears in the Lévy arcsine law, in the Erdős arcsine law, and as the Jeffreys prior for the probability of success of a Bernoulli trial.

Generalization

Arbitrary bounded support
The distribution can be expanded to include any bounded support from a ≤ x ≤ b by a simple transformation

for a ≤ x ≤ b, and whose probability density function is

on (a, b).

Shape factor

The generalized standard arcsine distribution on (0,1) with probability density function

is also a special case of the beta distribution with parameters .

Note that when  the general arcsine distribution reduces to the standard distribution listed above.

Properties
 Arcsine distribution is closed under translation and scaling by a positive factor
 If  
 The square of an arcsine distribution over (-1, 1) has arcsine distribution over (0, 1)
 If  
 The coordinates of points uniformly selected on a circle of radius  centered at the origin (0, 0), have an  distribution

Characteristic function

Related distributions

 If  is the generalized arcsine distribution with shape parameter  supported on the finite interval [a,b] then 
 If X ~ Cauchy(0, 1) then  has a standard arcsine distribution

Application

The arcsine distribution has an application to beamforming and pattern synthesis.
It is also the classical probability density for the simple harmonic oscillator.

References

Further reading

Continuous distributions